"I Miss You" is a Japanese-language song by South Korean boy band Boyfriend from their ninth Japanese single album of the same name. It's also their third overall Japanese single released under Kiss Entertainment. The single was released physically and digitally on February 22, 2017.

Track listing

Music videos

Release history

References 

Boyfriend (band) songs
2017 songs
2017 singles
Japanese-language songs
Starship Entertainment singles
Song articles with missing songwriters
Songs written by Steven Lee (music producer)